George Charles Cecil Black (21 November 1903 – 17 October 1932) was a member of the House of Representatives for  electorate, in the South Island of New Zealand, initially as a representative of the United Party and from early 1931 as an Independent. He committed suicide and was succeeded as MP by Keith Holyoake.

Early life
Born in Reefton on 21 November 1903, Black was the son of George James and Marianne Catherine Black. In 1923, Black became a Parliamentary Clerk of Committees.

Member of Parliament

Black represented the Motueka electorate in the House of Representatives from 1928 to 1932.

In the 1928 election, aged only 24, he stood as a United Party candidate and follower of Sir Joseph Ward and was successful. He unexpectedly beat the Reform Party incumbent of 14 years, Richard Hudson, and became the youngest MP at the time. He was appointed junior whip by the United Party.

In Parliament, Black refused to support the Finance Bill that proposed cuts to public service salaries and voted with the Labour Party, and in January 1931 he also opposed the decision to suspend construction of the Kawatiri–Inangahua railway line that ran through his electorate. Black was expelled from the United Party the day after voting against the Finance Bill in March 1931, saying that "no genuine supporter of the late Prime Minister", Sir Joseph Ward, could uphold such measures.

Later in the year, at the 1931 election, the bright and well-regarded local MP was elected as an independent. He was associated with Harry Atmore, the independent MP for the neighbouring Nelson electorate.

On 17 October 1932 aged 28, Black committed suicide with cyanide poison at Mākara Beach. He was survived by his wife and their child. The coroner found that Black had been mentally unstable for some months, and was also in financial difficulties.

Black's death triggered the 1932 Motueka by-election, which was won by Keith Holyoake.

Further reading

See also
List of members of the New Zealand Parliament who died in office
Nelson railway proposals

References

External links
  Report of George Black's Death. The Melbourne Argus Wednesday 19 October 1932, p.7

1903 births
1932 suicides
Independent MPs of New Zealand
People from Motueka
New Zealand MPs for South Island electorates
New Zealand Liberal Party MPs
New Zealand public servants
People from Reefton
New Zealand politicians who committed suicide
Suicides by cyanide poisoning
Members of the New Zealand House of Representatives
20th-century New Zealand politicians
Suicides in New Zealand